Defending champion Esther Vergeer and her partner Sharon Walraven defeated Daniela Di Toro and Lucy Shuker in the final, 6–2, 6–3 to win the ladies' doubles wheelchair tennis title at the 2010 Wimbledon Championships. Vergeer completed the double career Grand Slam with the win.

Korie Homan and Vergeer were the reigning champions, but Homan did not compete.

Seeds

  Esther Vergeer /  Sharon Walraven (champions)
  Florence Gravellier /  Jiske Griffioen (semifinals, fourth place)

Draw

Finals

References

External links
Draw

Women's Wheelchair Doubles
Wimbledon Championship by year – Wheelchair women's doubles
Wimb